Macedonian Greek or Greek Macedonian may refer to:

Something of, from, or related to Macedonia (Greece), a region in Greece
Macedonians (Greeks), the Greek people of Macedonia
Greeks in North Macedonia, those living as a minority in the neighbouring country
 Slavic speakers of Greek Macedonia, a Macedonian language-speaking minority in Northern Greece
Ancient Macedonians, an Ancient Greek people
Varieties of Modern Greek, spoken today in Macedonia, Greece
The ancient Macedonian language, an ancient Greek dialect

See also
Macedonian (disambiguation)
Ancient Macedonians
Ancient Macedonian language